Kangso Rey Wanem (also Kangsore) is the commander of the army of ancient Limbuwan who led to battle against the soldiers of Prithvi Narayan Shah at present Chainpur, Nepal where he was killed after he defeated the general commander of opposition army.

References

History of Nepal
18th-century Nepalese people